This is a sortable table of the approximately 600 townlands in County Carlow, Ireland.

Duplicate names occur where there is more than one townland with the same name in the county. Names marked in bold typeface are towns and villages, and the word Town appears for those entries in the Acres column.

Townland list

External links
 Townlands, Baronies and Civil Parishes of Co. Carlow in the OpenStreetMap database

References

 
Carlow
Carlow
Townlands